Açık may refer to:

Tutku Açık, Turkish basketball player
Açık Radyo, a radio station in Istanbul, Turkey

Turkish-language surnames